Anne Villeneuve (born September 7, 1966) is a Canadian writer and illustrator of children's books who lives in Quebec.

Life
She was born in Montreal and studied design and illustration at CEGEP Dawson. She was a finalist in the Communication-Jeunesse/Culinar competition. Villeneuve also has done artwork for scenery for Cirque du Soleil shows, murals for Red Bull and posters for the Dairy Farmers of Canada.

Selected works 
 Arthur's Dad (1991), text by Ginette Anfousse, 
 Une gardienne pour Étienne (1998), 
 L'Écharpe Rouge (1999), translated as The Red Scarf (2005), 
 Me voilà! (2004), text by Nathalie Savaria, 
 Chère Traudi (2008), 
 Loula et la recette fantasformidable, translated as Loula and the Sister Recipe (2014),  
 Loula part pour l'Afrique, translated as Loula is Leaving for Africa (2014),

Awards 
 1998: won a Mr. Christie's Book Award for Une gardienne pour Étienne.
 1999: won the Governor General's Award for French-language children's illustration for The Red Scarf.
 1999: won the Prix Québec-Wallonie-Bruxelles de littérature de jeunesse for The Red Scarf.
 1999: was shortlisted for a Mr. Christie's Book Award for The Red Scarf. 
 2004: won the TD Canadian Children's Literature Award for Le nul et la chipie.
 2008: won the TD Canadian Children's Literature Award for Chère Traudi.
 2014: won the Ruth and Sylvia Schwartz Award for Loula is Leaving for Africa. 
 2014: shortlisted for the Amelia Frances Howard-Gibbon Illustrator's Award for Loula is Leaving for Africa.

References 

1966 births
Living people
Governor General's Award-winning children's illustrators
Canadian women children's writers
Writers from Montreal
Canadian children's writers in French
Dawson College alumni